Beshel (also known as Besh) is a village in Sharq va Gharb-e Shirgah Rural District, North Savadkuh County, Mazandaran Province, Iran. At the 2006 census, its population was 567, in 150 families.

Etymology 
Beshel as a word is a combination of "Besh" and "eel". Besh (beş) is a Turkic word for the number five, and eel (ایل) is a Persian word used for tribes. Thus, Beshel could be translated as five tribes.

References 

Populated places in Savadkuh County